Seongju Do clan, also known by Family Do (Dho, To) of Seongju, was one of the Korean clans. Their Bon-gwan is in Seongju County, North Gyeongsang Province. According to the research in 2015, the number of Seongju Do clan was 54545. Their founder was  who was a Tang dynasty's citizen and made an achievement when Goryeo was built. Do Jin was appointed as Jeongseung, chosen as Seongsanbuwongun(Marquess of Seongju), and was settled in Seongju.

See also 
Korean clan names of foreign origin

References

External links 

 
Korean clan names of Chinese origin